Wilfried Maaß (22 September 1931–23 December 2005) was a German politician. He was the secretary of Science, Education, and Culture in the Frankfurt/Oder district leadership of the Socialist Unity Party of Germany 1962–1966. In 1966, he became deputy minister of culture of the German Democratic Republic. Between 1968 and 1972, he was a member of the presidium council of Kulturbund. In 1984 he left his ministerial position to become its secretary.

References

1931 births
2005 deaths
Socialist Unity Party of Germany politicians
German male writers